Atlantic Union Bank Center is a multi-purpose arena on the campus of James Madison University in Harrisonburg, Virginia that plays host to the James Madison Dukes men's and women's basketball teams. It seats 8,500 and opened for the 2020–21 NCAA Division I men's and women's basketball season, replacing the JMU Convocation Center. Atlantic Union Bank is the arena's naming partner.

The first games at the arena were played on November 25, 2020, when the men's team beat Limestone University 89–55, followed by the women's team winning 69-55 over Mount St. Mary's University.

Atlantic Union Bank Center was the host of the 2021 CAA men's basketball tournament. The conference moved the men's basketball tournament to Harrisonburg from the Entertainment and Sports Arena in Washington, D.C. as a result of the ongoing COVID-19 pandemic. The tournament was won by Drexel University.

References

College basketball venues in the United States
Basketball venues in Virginia
James Madison Dukes basketball
Sports venues completed in 2020
2020 establishments in Virginia